Dorota Wellman (born 2 March 1961 in Warsaw) is a Polish journalist, television and radio personality and television producer. She graduated in Polish studies and Art history from University of Warsaw. Wellman debuted in 1980s in Solidarity Radio and later in Radio Eska. Since 2006 she is known for presenting TV programme Dzień Dobry TVN.

She portrayed Polish activist Henryka Krzywonos in Andrzej Wajda's film Walesa. Man of Hope (2013).

References 

1961 births
Living people
Polish journalists
Polish women journalists
Polish television presenters
Polish women television presenters
Polish radio presenters
Polish women radio presenters
University of Warsaw alumni